Paphiopedilum helenae is a species of orchid endemic to Cao Bằng Province of Vietnam.

References

External links 

helenae
Endemic orchids of Vietnam
Plants described in 1996